Cambridge is a federal electoral district in Ontario, Canada, that has been represented in the House of Commons of Canada since 1979.

Geography

The district consists of most of the city of Cambridge, Ontario (the portion of it south of Highway 401), the entirety of the Township of North Dumfries, Ontario, and a portion of northern Brant County.

History

The federal electoral district was created in 1976 and consisted of the city of Cambridge and the Township of North Dumfries.  In 1987, part of the city of Kitchener was added to the district.  In 1996, the boundaries were redrawn again to include a slightly different section of Kitchener.  The current boundaries, which are the same as the original definition and contain no parts of Kitchener, were defined in 2003.

This riding lost territory to Kitchener South—Hespeler and gained some territory from Brant during the 2012 electoral redistribution.

Members of Parliament

Election results

See also
 List of Canadian federal electoral districts
 Past Canadian electoral districts

References

 History of Federal Ridings since 1867 (Cambridge)
2011 Results from Elections Canada
 2001 Federal Electoral District Profile (Cambridge)
 Campaign expense data from Elections Canada

Notes

Ontario federal electoral districts
Politics of Cambridge, Ontario